Beat is a German thriller television series, created and directed by Marco Kreuzpaintner, which was first released on Amazon Prime Video on 9 November 2018. After You Are Wanted, it is the second German-language Amazon Original Series. It was awarded a 2019 Grimme-Preis for fiction.

On 30 April 2019, it was announced that Beat would not return for a second season.

Cast 

 Jannis Niewöhner as Robert "Beat" Schlag
 Karoline Herfurth as Emilia
 Christian Berkel as Richard Diemer
 Alexander Fehling as Philipp Vossberg
 Hanno Koffler as Paul
 Kostja Ullmann as Jasper Hoff
 Nina Gummich as Janine
 Ludwig Simon as Janik
 Владимир Бурлаков

References

External links 
 

2018 German television series debuts
German-language television shows
German drama television series
Television shows set in Berlin
Amazon Prime Video original programming
Grimme-Preis for fiction winners